Angora Love is the final silent film made by Laurel and Hardy, released on December 14, 1929.

This was Laurel and Hardy's final silent film. It was released late in 1929 when most Hollywood studios had fully converted to sound productions.

Plot
A stray goat wanders away from a pet store and attaches itself to Laurel and Hardy after they kindly feed her doughnuts. The goat follows them everywhere. They are forced to bring it into their apartment and are not particularly effective at hiding it from their suspicious and outraged landlord. The comedy culminates with a hilarious water fight involving Stan and Ollie, the landlord, a fellow tenant, and a policeman. The policeman arrests the landlord and Stan & Ollie seem victorious..

Cast
Stan Laurel as Stan
Oliver Hardy as Ollie
Harry Bernard as Policeman
Charlie Hall as Neighbor
Edgar Kennedy as Landlord
Charley Young as Mr. Caribeau

Notes

Several jokes would be recycled in Laughing Gravy and The Chimp. The foot rubbing gag was re-used in Beau Hunks

TITLE CARD:"They lost the goat once.But it caught up with them in Saint Paul,Minnesota".

See also 
 Laurel and Hardy filmography

References

External links 
 
 
 
 

1929 films
1929 comedy films
American silent short films
American black-and-white films
Short films directed by Lewis R. Foster
Laurel and Hardy (film series)
Metro-Goldwyn-Mayer short films
1929 short films
Films with screenplays by H. M. Walker
American comedy short films
1920s American films
Silent American comedy films